KSYV (96.7 FM, "Mix 96.7") is a commercial radio station that is licensed to Solvang, California, United States and broadcasts to the Santa Maria-Lompoc, California area. The station is owned by Knight Broadcasting Inc. and airs an adult contemporary music format. KSYV features programming from AP Radio.

History
KSYV first signed on September 20, 1982 with a middle of the road music format. In 2001, original owner Pacific Coast Broadcasting Company sold KSYV to Knight Broadcasting Inc. for $655,000. At the time of the sale, the station broadcast an adult contemporary music format.

References

External links

SYV
Mainstream adult contemporary radio stations in the United States
Solvang, California
1982 establishments in California
Radio stations established in 1982